Zephaniah Platt (March 31, 1796 – April 20, 1871) was an American lawyer and politician from Michigan. He was Michigan Attorney General from 1841 to 1843.

Life
Platt was born on March 31, 1796 in Pleasant Valley, Dutchess County, New York.  He was the son of New York Supreme Court Justice Jonas Platt and Helena (nee Livingston) Platt (1767-1859), and was baptized at the Presbyterian Church in Pleasant Valley, N.Y. Among his siblings was sister, Helen Livingston Platt, who married Truman Parmelee and, after his death, Dr. Henry W. Bell.

He was a grandson of Zephaniah Platt, and a nephew of Charles Z. Platt and of John Henry Livingston.

Career
He removed to the Michigan Territory and practiced law at Jackson, Michigan.  Platt, an antislavery Whig, was Attorney General of the State of Michigan from 1841 to 1843.  He also served as a vice president in the American Anti-Slavery Society.

He attended the 1842 Ojibwe treaty negotiations with the "Lake Superior Chippewa" at LaPointe and signed the treaty as a witness. Subsequently Platt acted as representative for some of the American Fur Company's Ojibwe traders seeking recompense for past Indian debts.

After the end of the American Civil War, he removed to South Carolina, and was Judge of the 2nd Circuit Court from 1868 until his death.

Personal life
On September 30, 1818, he married Cornelia Jenkins (d. 1890), and they had seven children, including: 

 Mary Platt (1843–1911), who married J. J. Agnew. After his death, she married her cousin, Theodore Weld Parmele (1833–1893).

Platt died on April 20, 1871 in Aiken, Aiken County, South Carolina.

References

External links
 Index to Politicians: Pittsford to Platzek at The Political Graveyard.

Michigan Attorneys General
South Carolina state court judges
1796 births
1871 deaths
People from Pleasant Valley, New York
American Presbyterians
Politicians from Jackson, Michigan
Livingston family
People from Aiken, South Carolina